The 1961 Bandy World Championship was the second Bandy World Championship, after the first having been arranged four years earlier. From now on, the world championships were to be played every other year, so the next tournament was two years later. Noway hosted the competition as part of the 100th anniversary of the Norwegian Confederation of Sports. The 1961 tournament was contested between four men's bandy playing nations. The championship was played in Norway from 22 to 26 February 1961. The Soviet Union became champions.

Norway, having boycotted the first championship in 1957, made its championship début on home turf but lost all its games and came in last of the four participating nations.

Participants

Games
The championship was played as a round-robin tournament.

Results table

References

1961
1961 in bandy
1961 in Norwegian sport
International bandy competitions hosted by Norway
February 1961 sports events in Europe